Alice Louisa Theodora Zimmern (22 September 1855 – 22 March 1939) was an English writer, translator and suffragist. Her books made a significant contribution to debate on the education and rights of women.

Early years and education
Zimmern was born at Postern Street, Nottingham, the youngest of three daughters of the lace merchant Hermann Theodore Zimmern, a German Jewish immigrant, and his wife Antonia Marie Therese Regina Zimmern, née Leo, sister of Carl Leo, a syndic of Hamburg. Alice collaborated with her elder sister Helen Zimmern on two volumes of translated excerpts from European novels (1880 and 1884). The scholar and political scientist Alfred Eckhard Zimmern was a cousin of hers.

Alice Zimmern was educated at a private school and at Bedford College, London, before entering Girton College, Cambridge in 1881 to read Classics. She and Janet Case organized a society for classical drama that performed a 1883 college production of Elektra, "breaking down", as Virginia Woolf noted, "the tradition that only men acted in the Greek play." Zimmern left Girton in 1885 with honours in both parts of the Cambridge classical tripos. In 1888–1894, she taught Classics at English girls' schools, including Tunbridge Wells High School (1888–1891).

Career
While teaching, Zimmern produced a school edition of the Meditations of Marcus Aurelius in 1887, a translation of Hugo Bluemner's The Home Life of the Ancient Greeks (1893), and a translation of Porphyry: The Philosopher to his Wife Marcella (1896). She later wrote children's books on ancient Greece (Greek History for Young Readers, 1895, Old Tales from Greece, 1897) and Rome (Old Tales from Rome, 1906), all of which were reprinted several times. Greek History for Young Readers was still being praised in the Parents' Review six years later. 

In 1893, she and four other women were awarded Gilchrist scholarships to study the US education system. They were: Miss A. Bramwell, B.Sc., Lecturer at the Cambridge Training College; Miss S. A. Burstall, B.A., Mistress at the North London Collegiate School for Girls; Miss H. M. Hughes, Lecturer on Education at University College, Cardiff; Miss Mary Hannah Page, Head Mistress of the Skinners Company's School for Girls, Stamford Hill. Each woman received £100 to pursue their studies in the US for two months.

This resulted in her book Methods of Education in America (1894), in which she praised the articulacy of American school students and their enthusiasm for classic English literature, but noted that their written work and their textbooks were of a poor standard and the teaching of American history ludicrously patriotic.

Zimmern ceased to teach in schools in 1894, but continued to tutor private students in Classics. She regularly wrote journal articles on comparative education and the education of women. Her book Women's Suffrage in Many Lands (1909) appeared to coincide with the Fourth Congress of the International Women's Suffrage Alliance. This book and The Renaissance of Girls' Education (1898) made big contributions to the debate on the education and rights of women in Zimmern's time. In the former she noted an "intimate... connexion between enfranchisement and the just treatment of women." While most of her arguments are moderate and pragmatic, she acknowledges the militant tactics of British suffragettes as effective in making women's suffrage "the question of the day".

Much of Zimmern's research was done in the British Museum Reading Room, where she associated with suffragists and Fabians such as Edith Bland, Eleanor Marx, and Beatrice Potter. Other works by Zimmern include Demand and Achievement. The International Women's Suffrage Movement (1912), a translation of Paul Kajus von Hoesbroech's Fourteen Years a Jesuit (1911), and Gods and Heroes of the North (1907).

Resident in Hampstead in her later years, Zimmern was limited in her capacity to travel in the last decades of her life, although she remained interested in the rights of women and in pacifism, and continued to entertain many visitors from abroad. Her last work was a translation of The Origins of the War (1917) by Take Ionescu. She was unmarried and died at her home, 45 Clevedon Mansions, Highgate Road, London, on 22 March 1939. She was buried on 25 March at Kentish Town parish church. She left £150 to Girton College to establish the Alice Zimmern Memorial Prize in Classics.

References

1855 births
1939 deaths
19th-century British women writers
19th-century British writers
20th-century British women writers
20th-century translators
Translators to English
English Jews
English people of German-Jewish descent
English suffragists
British women activists
Jewish suffragists
People from Nottingham
Alumni of Bedford College, London
Alumni of Girton College, Cambridge
19th-century translators